Kłomnice  is a village in Częstochowa County, Silesian Voivodeship, in southern Poland. It is the seat of the gmina (administrative district) called Gmina Kłomnice.

The village has a population of 2,802.

During World War II the village was occupied by Germany. In September 1944, during the Warsaw Uprising, the Germans deported 2,000 Varsovians from the Dulag 121 camp in Pruszków, where they were initially imprisoned, to Kłomnice. Those Poles were mainly old people, ill people and women with children.

Gallery

References

External links 
 Jewish Community in Kłomnice on Virtual Shtetl

Villages in Częstochowa County